Azerbaijan participated at the 2015 European Games in Baku, Azerbaijan from 12 to 28 June 2015. As host nation, Azerbaijan automatically receives a number in quota places in each sport, regardless of how they fare in the qualification.

Medalists

| width=78% align=left valign=top |

|width=22% align=left valign=top |

Archery

As hosts, Azerbaijan has qualified a maximum of six athletes, on the condition that they enter three athletes per gender at the 2014 European Archery Championships.

Azerbaijan gained automatic entry into the last sixteen ahead of sixteenth-placed Great Britain as host.

Athletics

Azerbaijan finished in fifth place in the team event.
Men

Women

Badminton

Azerbaijan is guaranteed to enter two players. However a maximum of one player/pair per event will be allowed. If additional players qualify under the regulations, they may also be entered.

Basketball (3x3)

As host NOC, Azerbaijan will enter one men's and one women's team.

Beach soccer

Azerbaijan is guaranteed participation in beach soccer as hosts.

Boxing

Azerbaijan qualified a maximum of 15 athletes, one in each weight class.
Men

Women

Canoe sprint

Azerbaijan qualified more athletes at the 2014 European Championships.

Men

Women

Cycling

A total of seven Azerbaijani athletes competed at the games

Diving

Two divers competed for Azerbaijan at the games.

Fencing

Men

Women

Gymnastics

The host nation is guaranteed the maximum quota of 29 athletes in the gymnastics events.

Acrobatic

Aerobic

Men's artistic

Women's artistic

Rhythmic

Trampoline

Judo

Men

Women

Karate

As hosts, Azerbaijan had one athlete in each weight category.
Men

Women

Sambo

Shooting

Azerbaijan gained 9 host quota places.

Women

Mixed

Swimming

Azerbaijan had nine swimmers at the Games.

Women

Synchronized swimming

As host nation, Azerbaijan is guaranteed ten athletes in synchronized swimming.

 Women's events – 10 quota places

Table tennis

Azerbaijan had a team of six players, three men and three women.

Taekwondo

As hosts, Azerbaijan had eight athletes compete.

Triathlon

Three triathletes competed for Azerbaijan.

Volleyball

Azerbaijan will compete with two teams in each beach event, and with one team in each indoor event.

Beach

Indoor

Water polo

Azerbaijan will be represented in the men's tournament.

Wrestling

Men

Women

References

Nations at the 2015 European Games
European Games
2015